Meridolum middenense is a species of air-breathing land snail, a terrestrial pulmonate gastropod mollusk in the family Camaenidae. This species is endemic to Australia.

Ecology 
This species lives in open forests in the leaf litter.

References

External links 
 http://bie.ala.org.au/species/urn:lsid:biodiversity.org.au:afd.taxon:e5286581-adaa-456f-84ce-779f61242f48;jsessionid=5429EB264524B922B109437F4D0B750C

middenense
Gastropods described in 1954